Trevin is both a given name and surname. Notable people with the name include:

Trevin Bastiampillai (born 1985), Canadian cricketer
Trevin Caesar (born 1989), Trinidad and Tobago footballer
Trevin Mathew (born 1978), Sri Lankan cricketer
Trevin Parks (born 1991), American basketball player
Trevin Wade (born 1989), American football player
Antonio Trevín (born 1956), Spanish politician